Michael Colin Campbell is a male former athlete who competed for England.

Athletics career
Campbell was the National high jump champion in 1971 after winning the AAA Championships with a jump of 2.04m.

This led to his selection for England and he represented England in the high jump, at the 1970 British Commonwealth Games in Edinburgh, Scotland.

He was also a six times South of England champion.

References

English male high jumpers
Athletes (track and field) at the 1970 British Commonwealth Games
Commonwealth Games competitors for England